Henry Gordon "Abe" Munro (8 December 1896 – 21 November 1974) was a New Zealand rugby union player. He was a member of the New Zealand national side, the All Blacks, on their 1924 tour of New South Wales and 1924–25 tour of Britain, Ireland, France and Canada. On those tours, he played nine matches for the All Blacks, but did not appear in any internationals.

References

1896 births
1974 deaths
Rugby union players from Invercargill
New Zealand rugby union players
New Zealand international rugby union players
Canterbury rugby union players
Otago rugby union players
Rugby union hookers
University of Canterbury alumni
University of Otago alumni
20th-century New Zealand engineers